The Aditya Birla Public School, Rehla was founded in 1987 as Shiksha Niketan, and renamed The Aditya Birla Public School in April, 2002. It had only 25 students, at the start; there are now in the school over 1076 students. The school includes classes from KG through XII.

The school is managed by the Aditya Birla Chemicals India Limited, Garhwa Road, Palamau, Jharkhand. Mr SK Singh is the present Principal.

Academics
The school is a co-educational English medium school affiliated with the Central Board of Secondary Education, and follows their curriculum.  At the plus two level, the school has options in Science and Commerce.

Sixty to 70 students are admitted every year in Lower Kindergarten; admission to other classes occurs only when seats are available.

Reviews

Consumer Complaints forum of India rates the school with one star out of five.

In Jharkhand, India, an online test on sanitation standard was conducted with seven schools by the National School Sanitation Initiative in association with CBSE and Union Human Resource Development. Even the best of schools, including the Aditya Birla Public School failed to meet the required parameter. Out of seven, six of the schools got the red rating, the lowest.

References

External links
School web site

Schools in Jharkhand
Educational institutions established in 1987
1987 establishments in Bihar